The Mata das Flores State Park is a State park in the state of Espírito Santo, Brazil.

Location

It is surrounded by coffee plantations.
It holds an important remnant of Atlantic Forest and provides an ecological corridor from the warmer lowlands to the higher and colder Forno Grande and Pedra Azul state parks.
The park is popular for hiking and cycling among the large trees.

The main biome is dense montane semideciduous rainforest.
Vegetation include Cedrela, Cassia, bromeliads and palms.
The park contains examples of the giant jequitibá rosa (Cariniana legalis) as well as delicate orchids.
It takes ten adults  holding hands to encircle some of the jequitibás, which may be over 3,000 years old.
Fauna include hawks, toucans, owls, pacas, foxes, sloths, hedgehogs and capuchin monkeys.

History

The Mata das Flores State Park was created by state law 4.617 of 2 January 1992.
It became part of the Central Atlantic Forest Ecological Corridor, created in 2002.

Notes

Sources

1992 establishments in Brazil
Protected areas established in 1992
Protected areas of Espírito Santo
State parks of Brazil